Leonie Elva "Noni" Hazlehurst , (born 17 August 1953) is an Australian actress, director, writer, presenter and broadcaster who has appeared on television and radio, in dramas, mini-series and made for television films, as well also on stage and in feature films since the early 1970s. Hazlehurst has been honoured with numerous awards including Australian Film Institute Awards, ARIA Awards and Logies, including being inducted into the Hall of Fame in 2016.

Early life
Hazlehurst was born in Melbourne. After attending St Leonard's College in Brighton East, Victoria, Hazlehurst studied Drama at Flinders University in South Australia from 1971 to 1973, where she resided at Flinders University Hall and graduated with a Bachelor of Arts degree in 1974. She has studied ballet, singing, piano, speech and drama. In the 1980s and 1990s, much of her work concentrated on children's television.

Her parents were both English, and migrated to Australia in 1951.

Television work

Along with roles at the ABC, her first television work was in guest lead roles in television serials produced by Crawford Productions. She played the regular role of Sharon Lewis in The Box in 1975 before joining the original cast of The Sullivans as Lil Duggan in late 1976. She was a Play School presenter from 1978 to 2001, and has been a National Ambassador or Patron for many children's events and charities, including Children's Week (1991-2007) and Barnardos. She has worked extensively for children. Hazlehurst has recorded several music and spoken word albums, including the children's music album Shout and Whisper (1988).

Hazlehurst appeared in the miniseries Nancy Wake (played the title role), as well as such films and miniseries as The Shiralee, Ride on Stranger, and Waterfront in the 1980s.

From 1995 to 2005, she hosted the Seven Networks Better Homes and Gardens, a lifestyle show which is affiliated with the monthly magazine of the same name.

In 2006, she starred in ABC's telemovie Stepfather of the Bride. From 2007 to 2011, she played Detective Superintendent Bernice Waverley on Channel Seven crime drama City Homicide. In 2010, she was a guest on The 7pm Project on Network Ten. In July 2011, as part of a rapidly growing internet meme, she read the book Go the Fuck to Sleep to camera in the style she formerly used on Play School. She immediately offered to record a reading of the book after being sent a copy by the publisher.,

Beginning in 2013, she appeared as Elizabeth Bligh in the 1950s-set Australian melodrama A Place to Call Home on the Seven Network, playing the wealthy matriarch of the family. The show was renewed for a second series which premiered in 2014, following the second series the show was briefly canceled yet the show was unexpectedly commissioned for a third series which came in 2015. The show then went into production for a fourth series which aired in 2016 and a fifth season airing in 2017 with the final sixth season airing in 2018. She played "Ambrose" in ABC TV's The Letdown,  and as Pamela in a new series The End (2019).

Film work

Hazlehurst has had starring roles in Australian films since the 1980s, including roles in Fatty Finn, Fran and Australian Dream. Her most prominent role during this decade was as the lead, Nora, in Monkey Grip (1982), based on Helen Garner's novel of the same name. The film, concerning the relationship between a single mother and a heroin addict, was a modest box office success in Australia and received generally favourable reviews from critics. She later starred in Little Fish in 2005, Candy in 2006, and Bitter & Twisted in 2008. Recent film roles include The Mule, Truth, The Broken Shore and Ladies in Black.

Radio work
Hazlehurst is a regular freelance presenter on 774 ABC Melbourne.

Theatre

Credits include The Man from Mukinupin, On Our Selection, Traitors, Hamlet, No Names, No Packdrill, Cut and Thrust, Frankie & Johnny in the Claire De Lune, for the STC: Navigating (Dir: Marin Potts) The Breath of Life, Woman in Mind, for the MTC: Grace, (Dir: Marion Potts), Madagascar, (Dir: Sam Strong) and The Heretic, (Dir: Matt Scholten). In 2014 she appeared in a critically acclaimed production of The Beauty Queen of Leenane (Dir: Declan Eames) for the Kin Collective at 45 Downstairs. In 2015 and 2016 Noni performed in a one-woman play, Mother, (Dir: Matt Scholten), written for her by Daniel Keene, on a national tour produced by If Theatre & Regional Arts Victoria. Mother received two Helpmann Awards nominations for Best Performance by a Female Actor in a Play and Best Regional Touring Production for If Theatre. Mother was performed at Belvoir Street Theatre in early 2018 and was presented at the Queensland Performing Arts Centre in August 2018. Hazlehurst won the 2018 Matilda Award for Best Female Actor in a Leading Role for Mother.

Filmography

Television

Television film

Short film

Film

Awards and nominations

Other awards

Hazlehurst has also been an ambassador for Barnardo's Mother of the Year, and was awarded an Honorary Doctorate of Letters by her alma mater Flinders University in 2007.

Cultural references
In 1994 a painting of Hazlehurst by artist Rosemary Valadon titled Noni Hazlehurst – Summer '94 Waiting Again was a finalist in the Archibald Prize.

Personal life
Hazlehurst married director Kevin Dobson, and she subsequently married John Jarratt in circa 1987. She and Jarratt have two sons. After separating from Jarratt in August 1999, she dated cameraman Ian Marden.

Her son, William, is the former vocalist for Melbourne death pop band Storm The Sky.

References

External links

1953 births
Actresses from Melbourne
Australian women singers
Australian film actresses
Australian people of English descent
Australian television actresses
Best Actress AACTA Award winners
Best Supporting Actress AACTA Award winners
Australian children's television presenters
Flinders University alumni
Living people
Logie Award winners
Members of the Order of Australia
Australian women television presenters